John Joseph Adams (born 1976) is an American science fiction and fantasy editor, critic, and publisher.

Career

Editor

Adams worked as Assistant Editor at The Magazine of Fantasy & Science Fiction from May 2001 to December 2009. In January 2010 he left F&SF to edit Lightspeed Magazine, an online science fiction magazine which launched June 1, 2010. In March 2011 he took charge of its sister magazine, Fantasy Magazine. In June 2012, Adams and Creeping Hemlock Press successfully closed a $7,500 Kickstarter campaign for funding Nightmare Magazine, the first issue of which released October 2012.  Originally the co-publisher and editor-in-chief, Adams now serves as publisher.

Writer
Additionally, Adams is a writer whose genre essays, interviews, and book reviews have appeared in a variety of publications, including Amazing Stories, Kirkus Reviews, The Internet Review of Science Fiction, Intergalactic Medicine Show, Locus Magazine, Novel & Short Story Writer's Market, Publishers Weekly, SCI FI Wire, Science Fiction Weekly, Shimmer Magazine, Strange Horizons, Subterranean Magazine, and Tor.com.

Publisher
In November 2011 Adams purchased Lightspeed and Fantasy Magazine from Sean Wallace of Prime Books. With the January 2012 issue, the first published under Adams's ownership, the content of both magazines was combined under the Lightspeed masthead, and Fantasy Magazine was discontinued as an entity. The Fantasy Magazine staff was also absorbed into Lightspeed.

In 2015, Adams became the editor-at-large of John Joseph Adams Books in partnership with Houghton Mifflin Harcourt.

Podcaster

Since January 2010 Adams and science fiction author David Barr Kirtley have produced and hosted Geek's Guide to the Galaxy.

Accolades
His anthology The Living Dead was nominated for a World Fantasy Award and named one of the "Best Books of the Year" by Publishers Weekly. He has been called "The reigning king of the anthology world" by Barnes & Noble.com, and in 2011 he was named one of "100+ Geeks to Follow on Twitter" by TechRepublic. He is a finalist for the 2011 Hugo Award for Best Professional Editor, Short Form, and his magazine, Lightspeed Magazine, is a finalist for best semiprozine.

In 2017, John was nominated for a World Fantasy Award for Best Anthology for The Best American Science Fiction and Fantasy 2016.

Bibliography

Short fiction 

Anthologies edited
 Wastelands: Stories of the Apocalypse (Night Shade Books, January 2008)
 Seeds of Change (Prime Books, August 2008)
 The Living Dead (Night Shade Books, September 2008)
 Federations (Prime Books, May 2009)
 By Blood We Live (Night Shade Books, August 2009)
 The Improbable Adventures of Sherlock Holmes (Night Shade Books, September 2009)
 The Living Dead 2 (Night Shade Books, September 2010)
 The Way of the Wizard (Prime Books, November 2010)
 Lightspeed: Year One (Prime Books, November 2011)
 Armored (Baen Books, March 2012)
 Other Worlds Than These (Night Shade Books, July 2012)
 Epic: Legends of Fantasy (Tachyon Publications, November 2012).
 Brave New Worlds (Night Shade Books, 2nd edition December 2012)
 The Mad Scientist's Guide to World Domination (Tor Books, February 19, 2013)
 Dead Man's Hand: An Anthology of the Weird West (Titan Books, May 2014)
 The Apocalypse Triptych (2014 - 2015, with Hugh Howey)
 Operation Arcana (Baen Books, March 2015)
 Best American Science Fiction & Fantasy (2015, with Joe Hill)
 Loosed Upon the World: The Saga Anthology of Climate Fiction (2015)
 
 Best American Science Fiction & Fantasy (2016, with Karen Joy Fowler)

Critical studies and reviews of Adams' work
Press Start to play

References

External links
 John Joseph Adams: Official Site

1976 births
American podcasters
American speculative fiction critics
American speculative fiction editors
Hugo Award-winning editors
Living people
Male speculative fiction editors
Science fiction critics
Science fiction editors